Jalapa is an ejido  in the Mexican state of Baja California. It lies within Mexicali Municipality.

Its postal code is 21700 and its long-distance telephone dialing code is 686.

Populated places in Baja California
Mexicali Municipality